The 1991 San Jose State Spartans football team represented San Jose State University during the 1991 NCAA Division I-A football season as a member of the Big West Conference. The team was led by head coach Terry Shea, in his second year as head coach at San Jose State. They played home games at Spartan Stadium in San Jose, California. The Spartans finished the 1991 season as co-champions of the Big West conference, with a record of six wins, four losses and one tie (6–4–1, 6–1 Big West). This was their last conference title until 2020.

Schedule

Team players in the NFL
No San Jose State Spartans were selected in the 1992 NFL Draft.

Notes

References

San Jose State
San Jose State Spartans football seasons
Big West Conference football champion seasons
San Jose State Spartans football